Chloromethyl methyl sulfide is the organosulfur compound with the formula .  In terms of functional groups, it is a thioether and an alkyl chloride.  The compound is structurally related to sulfur mustards, i.e., it is a potentially hazardous alkylating agent.  The compound finds some use in organic chemistry as a protecting group.  In the presence of base, it converts carboxylic acids (RCO2H) to esters .  The compound is prepared by treatment of dimethylsulfide with sulfuryl chloride.

References

Thioethers
Organochlorides
Sulfur mustards